The 2008–09 AL-Bank Ligaen season was the 52nd season of ice hockey in Denmark. Ten teams participated in the league, and SønderjyskE Ishockey won the championship.

First round

Second round

Group A

Group B

Playoffs

External links
Season on Hockeyarchives.info

Dan
2008 in Danish sport
2009 in Danish sport